Burke's Tavern is a historic inn and tavern located near Burkeville, Nottoway County, Virginia. It was built in 1731, and is a one-story
frame building set upon a ground-level brick basement. The building has a central hall, single pile plan. It features brick exterior end chimneys.  Near the end of the American Civil War in 1865, the Union Brigadier General Thomas Alfred Smyth of Delaware, wounded at the Battle of High Bridge was brought to the house, where he died on April 9.  Smythe was the last Union general to be killed in the war.

It was listed on the National Register of Historic Places in 1975.

References

Drinking establishments on the National Register of Historic Places in Virginia
Buildings and structures in Nottoway County, Virginia
National Register of Historic Places in Nottoway County, Virginia